Royd R. Sayers (October 25, 1885 – April 23, 1965) was an American physician and industrial hygienist. He served as the Chief of the Division of Industrial Hygiene at the National Institute of Health and the 7th director of the U.S. Bureau of Mines.

Early life
Royd Ray Sayers was born on October 25, 1885, in Crothersville, Indiana. He graduated with a Bachelor of Arts and Master of Arts from the Indiana University in 1907. He then served as a professor of electrochemistry at the University of Buffalo from 1911 to 1913. He graduated with a M.D. from the University of Buffalo in 1914.

Career

Sayers joined the U.S. Public Health Service in 1914 and would remain with the service until 1948. In the 1930s, he designed the city of Baltimore, Maryland's industrial hygiene program. In January 1941, he was appointed as a medical director of the U.S. Public Health Service.

In 1917, Sayers became the Chief Surgeon and Chief of the Health and Safety Branch of the U.S. Bureau of Mines. He remained in this role until 1933 when he became the Chief of the Division of Industrial Hygiene at the National Institute of Health. He left this role in 1940.

On May 27, 1940, Sayers replaced John W. Finch as the director of the U.S. Bureau of Mines. He held this role until July 14, 1947. He then returned to working at the U.S. Public Health Service as a medical director. From September 20, 1950, until around 1960, Sayers served as the Senior Medical Supervisor of Occupational Diseases for the Baltimore City Health Department.

Sayers also served as president of the American Occupational Medical Association from 1937 to 1938.

Personal life
Sayers purchased the Robert E. Lee Boyhood Home in Alexandria, Virginia in 1932 from the heirs of Emmuella Burson. The Sayers worked to renovate and restore the property, and opened it up for private and public tours. The Sayers were neighbors with labor leader John L. Lewis. The Sayers sold the property in 1941, and then lived in the Lyceum in Alexandria and later the His Lordship's Kindness property in Prince George's County, Maryland.

Death
Sayers died on April 23, 1965.

Awards
In 1941, Sayers was awarded the Lifetime Achievement in Occupational and Environmental Medicine Award by the American Occupational Medical Association (now the American College of Occupational and Environmental Medicine).

References

External links 

 Royd R. Sayers Collection (MS094) (Alexandria Library)
 Profiles in Occupational Health: Royd Ray Sayers, A.D. Cloud, Industrial Medicine & Surgery (Dec 1959, pp. 586-591)

1885 births
1965 deaths
People from Jackson County, Indiana
Physicians from Indiana
Indiana University alumni
University at Buffalo alumni
University at Buffalo faculty
American occupational health practitioners
United States Public Health Service personnel
United States Bureau of Mines personnel
National Institutes of Health people